Baptiste Pesenti (born 3 July 1997) is a French rugby union player. His position is lock or  flanker and he currently plays for Racing 92 in the French Top 14.

In 2020, Pesenti was selected on several occasions by Fabien Galthié for the France national rugby union team.

References

External links
  Baptiste Pesenti on epcrugby.com

1997 births
Living people
French rugby union players
Section Paloise players
Rugby union locks
France international rugby union players
Racing 92 players
People from Saint-Claude, Jura
Sportspeople from Jura (department)